The 1932 United States presidential election in Kentucky took place on November 8, 1932, as part of the 1932 United States presidential election. Kentucky voters chose 11 representatives, or electors, to the Electoral College, who voted for president and vice president.

Kentucky was won by Governor Franklin D. Roosevelt (D–New York), running with Speaker John Nance Garner, with 59.06 percent of the popular vote, against incumbent President Herbert Hoover (R–California), running with Vice President Charles Curtis, with 40.15 percent of the popular vote. As of the 2020 presidential election, this is the last occasion when Adair County and Grayson County voted for a Democratic presidential candidate.

Results

Results by county

References

Kentucky
1932
1932 Kentucky elections